Test cricket is the oldest form of cricket played at international level. A Test match is scheduled to take place over a period of five days, and is played by teams representing full member nations of the International Cricket Council (ICC). England was a founding member of the ICC, having played the first Test match against Australia in March 1877 at the Melbourne Cricket Ground. , they have played more Test matches than any other team, and of their 1,059 games, have won 388, drawn 354 and lost 317. With 36.63 percent of matches won, this makes England the third most successful team in the history of Test cricket, behind Australia on 47.47 percent and South Africa on 38.20 percent.

Opening batsman and former captain Alastair Cook holds several England Test cricket records. Playing between 2006 and 2018, he scored 12,472 runs, making him the first England player to score 10,000 Test runs. He scored a record 57 half-centuries and 33 centuries. As a slip fielder, Cook has also taken the most catches for England with 175 and holds the England record for the most catches taken in a Test series with 13. Cook also holds the Test record for the most consecutive matches played with 159.

The most successful Test wicket-taker for England is James Anderson, who made his Test debut in 2003 and is currently still active. , he has played in a total of 179 Test matches and taken a record 685 wickets for a fast bowler at Test level, both records for England. He has also picked up five wickets in an innings on 32 occasions, which is the most for the national side. The corresponding record for taking ten wickets in a match is held by Sydney Barnes, who achieved this feat seven times. He also holds the Test record for the most wickets taken in a series, having removed members of the opposing side 49 times during the England tour of South Africa in 1913–14. Alan Knott is England's most successful wicket-keeper, having taken 269 dismissals. England claims two age records: James Southerton as the oldest player to make his Test debut, at 49, and Wilfred Rhodes, aged 52, as the oldest cricketer to ever play in a Test match.

Key
The top five records are listed for each category, except for the team wins, losses and draws and the partnership records. Tied records for fifth place are also included. Explanations of the general symbols and cricketing terms used in the list are given below. Specific details are provided in each category where appropriate. All records include matches played for England only, and are correct .

Team records

Team wins, losses and draws
, England have played 1,060 Test matches resulting in 388 victories, 318 defeats and 354 draws for an overall winning percentage of 36.60, the third highest winning percentage of Test playing teams. England has played the highest number of Test matches, ahead of Australia who have competed in 851. England is undefeated against Ireland and have defeated Bangladesh on all but one occasion. England played the debut Test matches of Australia, India, New Zealand, South Africa, Sri Lanka and the West Indies – winning all of them except against Australia.

Team scoring records

Most runs in an innings
The highest innings total scored in Test cricket came in the series between Sri Lanka and India in August 1997. Playing in the first Test at the R. Premadasa Stadium in Colombo, the hosts posted a first innings total of 952/6d. This broke the longstanding record of 903/7d which England set against Australia in the final Test of the 1938 Ashes series at The Oval. This in turn broke England's 849 all out against the West Indies in 1930.

Highest successful run chases
The highest successful run chase came in the West Indies victory over Australia in May 2003 at the Antigua Recreation Ground. Set 418 for victory in the final innings, the hosts achieved the target for the loss of seven wickets. England's highest successful chase came in the fifth Test of the 2021 series against India at Edgbaston (held over until 2022 due to the COVID-19 pandemic). England reached the target of 378 runs with seven wickets in hand, having successfully chased a target of over 300 runs in Test matches on only four previous occasions.

Fewest runs in an innings
The lowest innings total scored in Test cricket came in the second Test of England's tour of New Zealand in March 1955. Trailing England by 46, New Zealand were bowled out in their second innings for 26 runs. The equal twelfth-lowest score in Test history is England's total of 45 scored in their first innings against Australia in the first Test of the 1886–87 Ashes series.

Result records

A Test match is won when one side has scored more runs than the total runs scored by the opposing side during their two innings. If both sides have completed both their allocated innings and the side that fielded last has the higher aggregate of runs, it is known as a win by runs. This indicates the number of runs that they had scored more than the opposing side. If one side scores more runs in a single innings than the total runs scored by the other side in both their innings, it is known as a win by an innings and runs. If the side batting last wins the match, it is known as a win by wickets, indicating the number of wickets that were still to fall.

Greatest win margins (by innings)
The fifth Test of the 1938 Ashes series at The Oval saw England win by an innings and 579 runs, the largest victory by an innings in Test cricket history. The next largest victory was Australia's win against South Africa in the first Test of the 2001–02 tour at the Wanderers Stadium, where the tourists won by an innings and 360 runs.

Greatest win margins (by runs)
The greatest winning margin by runs in Test cricket was England's victory over Australia by 675 runs in the first Test of the 1928–29 Ashes series. The next two largest victories were recorded by Australia including defeat over England in the final Test of the 1934 Ashes series by 562 runs.

Greatest win margins (by 10 wickets)
England have won a Test match by a margin of 10 wickets on 20 occasions, the third highest behind Australia on 30 and the West Indies on 28.

Narrowest win margins (by runs)

England's narrowest win by runs was against Australia in the second Test of the 2005 Ashes series at Edgbaston. Set 282 runs for victory in the final innings, Australia were bowled all out for 279 to give victory to the hosts by two runs. This was the second-narrowest win in Test cricket, with the narrowest being the West Indies' one-run win over Australia in 1993.

Narrowest win margins (by wickets)

England have won by a margin of one wicket on four occasions, the most recent being the third Test of the 2019 Ashes series at Headingley. This match saw the hosts achieving their highest successful run chase in Test cricket of 359 runs, one of only fourteen one-wicket victories in Test cricket.

Greatest loss margins (by innings)
England suffered their greatest defeat by an innings at The Gabba in the first Test of the 1946–47 Ashes series, the first Test match to be played in Australia after the Second World War. Going down to the hosts by an innings and 332 runs, this is the fourth-heaviest defeat in Test cricket history.

Greatest loss margins (by runs)
The first Test of the 1928–29 Ashes series saw Australia defeated by England by 675 runs, the greatest losing margin by runs in Test cricket. The results were reversed in the fifth and final Test of the 1934 Ashes series at The Oval where the tourists defeated the hosts by 562 runs, England's greatest defeat by runs.

Greatest loss margins (by 10 wickets)
England have lost a Test match by a margin of 10 wickets on 25 occasions, more than any other Test playing team.

Narrowest loss margins (by runs)

Only two matches in  years of Test cricket has been decided by a margin of one run. First was the fourth Test of the West Indian tour of Australia in 1992–93 where the visitors secured victory, which was equalled in England's loss in the second Test of their 2023 tour to New Zealand at Basin Reserve, Wellington. England had made New Zealand follow-on, but a second innings of 483 from the home team set a target of 257. This was also only the fourth time that a team made to follow-on had won a Test.

Narrowest loss margins (by wickets)
Test cricket has seen fourteen matches decided by a margin of one wicket, with England being defeated in one of them. The first Test of the 1905–06 series against South Africa at Old Wanderers saw the home side chase down the target of 284 runs in the final innings.

Individual records

Batting records

Most career runs
A run is the basic means of scoring in cricket.

India's Sachin Tendulkar has scored the most runs in Test cricket with 15,921. Second is Ricky Ponting of Australia with 13,378 ahead of Jacques Kallis from South Africa in third with 13,289. Alastair Cook, one of two England batsman to have scored more than 10,000 runs in Test cricket, is in fifth with 12,472.

Highest individual score
The final Test of the 2003–04 series of the Wisden Trophy, contested between England and the West Indies, at the Antigua Recreation Ground saw Brian Lara of the West Indies set the highest Test score with 400 not out. Len Hutton's score of 364 runs against Australia during the final Test of the 1938 Ashes series at The Oval is the sixth highest individual score in Test cricket and the highest by an England player. Wally Hammond's 336, scored against New Zealand in 1933, is the third highest not out Test innings and the ninth highest overall. Hutton's, Hammond's and Andy Sandham's 325 against the West Indies in 1930 were Test record scores at the time they were scored.

Highest career average

A batsman's batting average is the total number of runs they have scored divided by the number of times they have been dismissed.

Australia's Don Bradman, widely acknowledged as the greatest batsman of all time, finished his Test career with an average of 99.94. With 60.73, Herbert Sutcliffe is one of only five batsmen to finish his international career with an average above 60.

Most half-centuries
A half-century is a score of between 50 and 99 runs. Statistically, once a batsman's score reaches 100, it is no longer considered a half-century but a century.

Sachin Tendulkar of India has scored the most half-centuries in Test cricket with 68. He is followed by the West Indies' Shivnarine Chanderpaul on 66, India's Rahul Dravid and Allan Border of Australia are third on 63 and in seventh with 57 fifties to his name, England's Alastair Cook.

Most centuries
A century is a score of 100 or more runs in a single innings.

Tendulkar has also scored the most centuries in Test cricket with 51. South Africa's Jacques Kallis is next on 45 and Ricky Ponting with 41 hundreds is in third. The highest ranked England player is Alastair Cook in tenth with 33 centuries.

Most double centuries

A double century is a score of 200 or more runs in a single innings.

Bradman holds the Test record for the most double centuries scored with twelve, one ahead of Sri Lanka's Kumar Sangakkara who finished his career with eleven. In third is Brian Lara of the West Indies with nine. England's Wally Hammond, India's Virat Kohli and Mahela Jayawardene of Sri Lanka have all reached the mark on seven occasions.

Most triple centuries
A triple century is a score of 300 or more runs in a single innings.

Four cricketers hold the Test record for the most triple centuries scored with two – Don Bradman, India's Virender Sehwag and West Indians Chris Gayle and Brian Lara. Five England players have scored a single Test triple century with former captain Graham Gooch the most recent to do so in 1990, .

Most runs in a series
The 1930 Ashes series in England saw Bradman set the record for the most runs scored in a single series, falling just 26 short of 1,000 runs. He is followed by Wally Hammond with 905 runs scored in the 1928–29 Ashes series. Alastair Cook's 766 runs scored during the 2010–11 Ashes series ranks in 14th.

Most ducks
A duck refers to a batsman being dismissed without scoring a run. Former West Indian fast bowler Courtney Walsh has scored the highest number of ducks in Test cricket with 43 followed by England's Stuart Broad with 39. James Anderson, with 31 scoreless innings, is eighth on the list.

Bowling records

Most career wickets
A bowler takes the wicket of a batsman when the form of dismissal is bowled, caught, leg before wicket, stumped or hit wicket. If the batsman is dismissed by run out, obstructing the field, handling the ball, hitting the ball twice or timed out the bowler does not receive credit.

Sri Lankan bowler Muttiah Muralitharan holds the record for taking the most wickets in Test cricket with 800, followed by Australia's Shane Warne who previously held the record with 708. James Anderson of England is third on the list with 685 Test wickets to his name , having passed Australia's Glenn McGrath to become the fast bowler with the most Test wickets in September 2018. Stuart Broad, with 576, is the second-highest England Test wicket-taker and fifth overall, after becoming the second fast bowler to overtake McGrath's total of 563 wickets in September 2022. Of genuine all-rounders, no England player has taken more wickets than Ian Botham, who also scored 5,200 Test runs.

Best figures in an innings
Bowling figures refers to the number of the wickets a bowler has taken and the number of runs conceded.

There have been three occasions in Test cricket where a bowler has taken all ten wickets in a single innings – Jim Laker of England took 10/53 against Australia in 1956, India's Anil Kumble in 1999 returned figures of 10/74 against Pakistan and in 2021 Ajaz Patel of New Zealand took 10/119 against India. George Lohmann, one of sixteen bowlers who have taken nine wickets in a Test match innings, sits fourth on the list taking figures of 9/28 against South Africa in 1896.

Best figures in a match
A bowler's bowling figures in a match is the sum of the wickets taken and the runs conceded over both innings.

No bowler in the history of Test cricket has taken all 20 wickets in a match. The closest to do so was English spin bowler Jim Laker. During the fourth Test of the 1956 Ashes series, Laker took 9/37 in the first innings and 10/53 in the second to finish with match figures of 19/90. Sydney Barnes's figures of 17/159, taken in the second Test of the 1913–14 South African tour, is the second-best in Test cricket history.

Best career average

A bowler's bowling average is the total number of runs they have conceded divided by the number of wickets they have taken.

Nineteenth century English medium pacer George Lohmann holds the record for the best career average in Test cricket with 10.75. J. J. Ferris, one of fifteen cricketers to have played Test cricket for more than one team, is second behind Lohmann with an overall career average of 12.70 runs per wicket. Billy Barnes is third on the list, finishing his Test career with an average of 15.54.

Best career strike rate
A bowler's strike rate is the total number of balls they have bowled divided by the number of wickets they have taken.

As with the career average above, the top two bowlers with the best Test career strike rate are George Lohmann and J. J. Ferris, with Lohmann on 34.1 and Ferris with an overall career strike rate of 37.7 balls per wicket.

Best career economy rate

A bowler's economy rate is the total number of runs they have conceded divided by the number of overs they have bowled.

English bowler William Attewell, who played 10 Tests between 1884 and 1892, holds the Test record for the best career economy rate with 1.31. Cliff Gladwin, with a rate of 1.60 runs per over conceded over his 8-match Test career, is second on the list.

Most five-wicket hauls in an innings

A five-wicket haul refers to a bowler taking five wickets in a single innings.

Sri Lanka's Muttiah Muralitharan has taken the most five-wicket hauls in Test cricket with 67 throughout his career followed by Shane Warne achieving 37. James Anderson is the highest ranked England player in sixth, with 32.

Most ten-wicket hauls in a match
A ten-wicket haul refers to a bowler taking ten or more wickets in a match over two innings.

As with the five-wicket hauls above, Muttiah Muralitharan leads Shane Warne in taking the most ten-wicket hauls in Test cricket with Muralitharan having taken 22 to Warne's 10. Sydney Barnes of England is in equal sixth with three other bowlers, each achieving the feat on seven occasions.

Worst figures in an innings
The worst figures in a single innings in Test cricket came in the third Test between the West Indies at home to Pakistan in 1958. Pakistan's Khan Mohammad returned figures of 0/259 from his 54 overs in the second innings of the match. The worst figures by an England player are 0/169 that came off the bowling of Tich Freeman in his final Test appearance.

Worst figures in a match
The worst figures in a match in Test cricket were taken by South Africa's Imran Tahir in the second Test against Australia at the Adelaide Oval in November 2012. He returned figures of 0/180 from his 23 overs in the first innings and 0/80 off 14 in the third innings for a total of 0/260 from 37 overs. He claimed the record in his final over when two runs came from it – enough for him to pass the previous record of 0/259, set 54 years prior.

The worst figures by an England player came in the fourth Test of the 1989–90 tour of the West Indies when Devon Malcolm returned figures of 0/142 and 0/46 for a total of 0/188 off 43 overs.

Most wickets in a series

England's seventh Test tour of South Africa in 1913–14 saw the record set for the most wickets taken by a bowler in a Test series. English paceman Sydney Barnes played in four of the five matches and achieved a total of 49 wickets to his name. Jim Laker sits second on the list with 46 wickets taken during the 1956 Ashes series.

Wicket-keeping records
The wicket-keeper is a specialist fielder who stands behind the stumps being guarded by the batsman on strike and is the only member of the fielding side allowed to wear gloves and leg pads.

Most career dismissals
A wicket-keeper can be credited with the dismissal of a batsman in two ways, caught or stumped. A fair catch is taken when the ball is caught fully within the field of play without it bouncing after the ball has touched the striker's bat or glove holding the bat, while a stumping occurs when the wicket-keeper puts down the wicket while the batsman is out of his ground and not attempting a run.

South Africa's Mark Boucher has taken the most dismissals in Test cricket as a designated wicket-keeper with 555, followed by Adam Gilchrist of Australia on 416. England's Alan Knott, who took 269 dismissals during his 95-Test match career, is eighth on the list. He is followed by his compatriots Matt Prior and Alec Stewart in ninth and tenth with 256 and 241 dismissals respectively.

Most career catches

Boucher also leads Gilchrist in the number of catches taken as a designated wicket-keeper in Test cricket, 532 to 379. Alan Knott, with 250 catches to his name is eighth on this list. He is again followed by Prior and Stewart in ninth and tenth with 243 and 227 catches respectively.

Most career stumpings
Australia's Bert Oldfield holds the record for the most stumpings in Test cricket with 52. He is followed by Godfrey Evans of England with 46 to his name.

Most dismissals in an innings
Four wicket-keepers have taken seven dismissals in a single innings in a Test match—Wasim Bari of Pakistan in 1979, Englishman Bob Taylor in 1980, New Zealand's Ian Smith in 1991 and most recently West Indian gloveman Ridley Jacobs against Australia in 2000.

The feat of taking 6 dismissals in an innings has been achieved by 25 wicket-keepers on 33 occasions including 7 Englishmen on 11 occasions.

Most dismissals in a series
Brad Haddin holds the Test cricket record for the most dismissals taken by a wicket-keeper in a series. He took 29 catches during the 2013 Ashes series which broke the previous record held by fellow Australian Rod Marsh when he took 28 catches in the 1982–83 Ashes series. Jack Russell of England is equal third with 27 dismissals taken during the 1995–96 tour of South Africa.

Fielding records

Most career catches
Caught is one of the nine methods a batsman can be dismissed in cricket. A fair catch is defined as a fielder catching the ball, from a legal delivery, fully within the field of play without it bouncing when the ball has touched the striker's bat or glove holding the bat. The majority of catches are caught in the slips, located behind the batsman, next to the wicket-keeper, on the off side of the field. Most slip fielders are top order batsmen.

India's Rahul Dravid holds the record for the most catches in Test cricket by a non-wicket-keeper with 210, followed by Mahela Jayawardene of Sri Lanka on 205 and South African Jacques Kallis with 200. Former captain Alastair Cook is the highest ranked England player in sixth, securing 175 catches in his Test career.

Most catches in a series
The 1920–21 Ashes series, in which Australia whitewashed England 5–0 for the first time, saw the record set for the most catches taken by a non-wicket-keeper in a Test series. Australian all-rounder Jack Gregory took 15 catches in the series as well as 23 wickets. Greg Chappell and KL Rahul are joint second behind Gregory with 14 catches taken during the 1974–75 Ashes series and the 2018 India tour of England respectively. The same series saw Alastair Cook become the highest placed England player in equal fourth with 13 catches taken alongside Bob Simpson, Brian Lara and Rahul Dravid.

Other records

Most career matches
India's Sachin Tendulkar holds the record for the most Test matches played with 200, with James Anderson in second with 179 caps . Former captains Ricky Ponting and Steve Waugh are joint third with each having represented Australia on 168 occasions. Anderson is one of 15 cricketers to have played 100 Tests for England.

Most consecutive career matches

Former English captain Alastair Cook holds the record for the most consecutive Test matches played with 159. Cook equalled the previous record of 153, set by Australia's Allan Border, during the first Test of the two-match series against Pakistan in May 2018 and broke it by playing in the second Test of the same series. Former English skipper Joe Root brought his run of 77 consecutive Tests to an end when he missed the first Test against the West Indies in July 2020, due to the birth of his second child.

Most matches as captain

Graeme Smith, who led the South African cricket team from 2003 to 2014, holds the record for the most matches played as captain in Test cricket with 109. Allan Border, who skippered Australia from 1984 to 1994 is second with 93 matches. Joe Root, is seventh on the list with 64 matches .

Youngest players
The youngest player to play in a Test match is claimed to be Hasan Raza at the age of 14 years and 227 days. Making his debut for Pakistan against Zimbabwe on 24 October 1996, there is some doubt as to the validity of Raza's age at the time. The youngest cricketer to play Test cricket for England was Rehan Ahmed who was 18 years and 126 days old when he debuted in the third Test of the series against Pakistan in December 2022.

Oldest players on debut
At 49 years and 119 days, James Southerton of England, playing in the very first Test match in March 1877, is the oldest player to make his debut in Test cricket. Second on the list is Miran Bakhsh of Pakistan who at 47 years and 284 days made his debut against India in 1955.

Oldest players

England all-rounder Wilfred Rhodes is the oldest player to appear in a Test match. Playing in the fourth Test against the West Indies in 1930 at Sabina Park, in Kingston, Jamaica, he was aged 52 years and 165 days on the final day's play. The second-oldest Test player is Bert Ironmonger who was aged 50 years and 327 days when he represented Australia for the final time in the fifth Test of the 1932–33 Ashes series at the Sydney Cricket Ground.

Partnership records
In cricket, two batsmen are always present at the crease batting together in a partnership. This partnership will continue until one of them is dismissed, retires or the innings comes to a close.

Highest partnerships by wicket
A wicket partnership describes the number of runs scored before each wicket falls. The first wicket partnership is between the opening batsmen and continues until the first wicket falls. The second wicket partnership then commences between the not out batsman and the number three batsman. This partnership continues until the second wicket falls. The third wicket partnership then commences between the not out batsman and the new batsman. This continues down to the tenth wicket partnership. When the tenth wicket has fallen, there is no batsman left to partner so the innings is closed.

English batsmen hold three Test wicket partnerships records, all set since 2010. Ben Stokes and Jonny Bairstow came together in the second Test of the 2015–16 series against South Africa at Newlands Cricket Ground and put together a sixth wicket partnership of 399 runs. The recently retired Jonathan Trott and the still active Stuart Broad set the highest eighth wicket partnership of 332 runs at Lord's in August 2010 against Pakistan. Finally, the tenth wicket partnership of 198 was made by Joe Root and James Anderson in the first Test against India at Trent Bridge in July 2014.

Highest partnerships by runs
The highest Test partnership by runs for any wicket is held by the Sri Lankan pairing of Kumar Sangakkara and Mahela Jayawardene who put together a third wicket partnership of 624 runs during the first Test against South Africa in July 2006. This broke the record of 576 runs set by their compatriots Sanath Jayasuriya and Roshan Mahanama against India in 1997. New Zealand's Andrew Jones and Martin Crowe hold the third-highest Test partnership with 467 made in 1991 against Sri Lanka. The English pairing of Peter May and Colin Cowdrey together scored 411 for the fourth wicket against the West Indies in 1957 to place themselves thirteenth on the list.

Umpiring records

Most matches umpired
An umpire in cricket is a person who officiates the match according to the Laws of Cricket. Two umpires adjudicate the match on the field, whilst a third umpire has access to video replays, and a fourth umpire looks after the match balls and other duties. The records below are only for on-field umpires.

Aleem Dar of Pakistan holds the record for the most Test matches umpired with 143, . The currently active Dar set the record in December 2019 overtaking West Indian Steve Bucknor's mark of 128 matches. They are followed by South Africa's Rudi Koertzen who officiated in 108. The most experienced Englishman is David Shepherd who is fifth on the list with 92 Test matches umpired. Dickie Bird, who previously held the record with 66 Tests, is currently fifteenth .

Notes

References

Test cricket records
England